The Abraham Watson House is a historic house in Cambridge, Massachusetts.

Description 
It is a -story wood-frame structure, five bays wide, with a gable roof that has a gambrel front. It was built c. 1750 by Abraham Watson, Jr., who was politically active during the American Revolution. The house features, including molded surrounds on the windows, indicate that Watson was a man of substance. The house is one of only two colonial houses standing in North Cambridge, and is the oldest house in the city outside Old Cambridge.

The house was listed on the National Register of Historic Places on April 13, 1982.

See also
National Register of Historic Places listings in Cambridge, Massachusetts

References

Houses completed in 1750
Houses on the National Register of Historic Places in Cambridge, Massachusetts
Georgian architecture in Massachusetts